In demonology, Ose (Pronounced /ˈɒze/), is a Great President of Hell, ruling three legions of demons (thirty to other authors, and Pseudomonarchia Daemonum gives no number of legions). He makes men wise in all liberal sciences and gives true answers concerning divine and secret things; he also brings insanity to any person the conjurer wishes, making them believe that they are king and wearing a crown, or a Pope. However, his spells only last 1 hour at a time.

Additionally, Ose has the ability to transform people into animals. The victims of the curse will be unaware that they were turned into animals.

Ose is depicted as a leopard that after a while changes into a man.

Etymology 
His name seems to derive from Latin 'os', mouth, language, bone, or 'osor', that who abhors.

Other spellings: Osé, Oze, Oso, Voso.

See also

 The Lesser Key of Solomon

References

Further reading 

 S. L. MacGregor Mathers, A. Crowley, The Goetia: The Lesser Key of Solomon the King (1904). 1995 reprint: .

Goetic demons